A keratocyst is a type of cutaneous cyst. They appear similar to epidermoid cysts; however, are not limited to a specified location on the body. Keratocyst are most often reported in persons with nevoid basal cell carcinoma syndrome.

Pathology
Keratocysts have a stratified squamous epithelial wall without sebaceous lobules.

See also 
 List of cutaneous conditions

References

Dermal and subcutaneous growths